Elena Tărîță (born 18 November 1954) is a Romanian sprinter. She competed in the women's 400 metres at the 1980 Summer Olympics.

References

1954 births
Living people
Athletes (track and field) at the 1980 Summer Olympics
Romanian female sprinters
Olympic athletes of Romania
Place of birth missing (living people)
Universiade medalists in athletics (track and field)
Universiade bronze medalists for Romania